Paul John Maskey (born 10 June 1967) is an Irish republican politician in Northern Ireland who is a member of Sinn Féin. He served as a Sinn Féin member (MLA) of the Northern Ireland Assembly for Belfast West from 2007 to 2012. He has served as the Member of Parliament (MP) for the Westminster constituency of Belfast West since 2011, but in line with Sinn Féin's policy of abstentionism he has not taken his seat in the House of Commons.

Tourism
Maskey has been employed by Fáilte Feirste Thiar ('Welcome to West Belfast'), an agency promoting tourism into that part of the city. As development co-ordinator in 2004 he helped launch an initiative under which 120 local businesses agreed to accept the euro, to help encourage visitors from across the border and elsewhere in the Eurozone. In December 2005, as chair of the West Belfast Partnership, he linked up with Shankill Tourism to set up an Arts and Heritage trail which included both the Shankill Road and Falls Road areas. He welcomed publication of a tourist map of Belfast in 2006 which included a Gaeltacht Quarter in west Belfast, and in 2008 the group published a map and guide to all gable end murals in the west of Belfast. When he was elected to the Northern Ireland Assembly, Maskey became unpaid chair of Fáilte Feirste Thiar.

Belfast City Council
At the local elections of 7 June 2001, Maskey was elected as a Sinn Féin councillor for the Upper Falls electoral area on Belfast City Council, topping the poll on first preferences. He became chairman of the Belfast Waterfront Hall Board, helping to guide the venue to be ranked as the best congress centre in the UK and the fifth best in the World at the final of the Apex Award 2004 – World's Best Congress Centre awards, organised by the International Association of Congress Centres.

He was also chairman of the Client Services committee of Belfast City Council. but in January 2005 he could not win committee or council support for a proposal costing £175,000 to convert the minor hall used by the Group Theatre at the Ulster Hall into dual-purpose performance space during the refurbishment of the Hall. From 2005 he was leader of the Sinn Féin group on the City Council. Maskey resigned his seat on 14 September 2009.

Northern Ireland Assembly
Maskey was elected to the Northern Ireland Assembly in the 2007 elections as part of a Sinn Féin team which won five out of the six seats in Belfast West. After a Public Accounts Committee report criticised the waste of money on a project to build a campus of the University of Ulster on one of the peace lines at Springvale in north Belfast, Maskey placed the blame on the SDLP Minister Carmel Hanna. He became chairman of the committee in May 2008. In July 2009 he supported a committee investigation into the £33m paid annually in legal fees and compensation to people claiming for tripping on pavements.

Under Maskey's chairmanship the committee held a detailed scrutiny of Northern Ireland Water in 2010, after it awarded 70 contracts without competition. Maskey denounced the situation as "absolutely staggering" and said that he could not remember "a more serious case of complete disregard for public sector ethics." The committee held a meeting to question officers of NI Water which took three and a half hours; Maskey joked at the end that the officers would need an "articulated lorry" to send all the information requested by MLAs.

When Maskey organised a protest against a parade by Royal Irish Regiment soldiers returning from Iraq and Afghanistan in October 2008, he explained that he wanted "a peaceful, dignified protest" against the wars, but that he did want to see British forces returning without injury. In December 2010 Maskey criticised other political parties in Northern Ireland for seeking to keep the details of people who funded them confidential; he said that "justifiable public cynicism is generated when it is perceived that political parties are not being open about their financial affairs." He was re-elected in 2011, topping the poll with 5,343 first preference votes. He was again named as Chairperson of the Public Accounts Committee in the new mandate.

UK Parliament
After his re-election to the Northern Ireland Assembly, Maskey announced on 12 May 2011 that he would be standing for selection as Sinn Féin candidate for the Belfast West constituency in the House of Commons of the United Kingdom, which had been left vacant when Sinn Féin President Gerry Adams resigned to fight for a seat in Dáil Éireann. He was immediately supported by Gerry Kelly MLA. and as the only nomination for the vacancy, was selected on 19 May. At the by-election on 9 June, Maskey was elected with over 70% of the vote; he said that he had received votes from all parts of the constituency including the Shankill Road and said that he hoped to hold a constituency surgery there. He was re-elected with an increased vote in the 2015 General Election.

References

External links
 Sinn Fein Profile
 

Living people
Northern Ireland MLAs 2007–2011
Northern Ireland MLAs 2011–2016
Members of Belfast City Council
1967 births
Sinn Féin MLAs
UK MPs 2010–2015
UK MPs 2015–2017
UK MPs 2017–2019
UK MPs 2019–present
Sinn Féin MPs (post-1921)
Members of the Parliament of the United Kingdom for Belfast constituencies (since 1922)
Sinn Féin councillors in Northern Ireland